Blood Hill is a wind farm near Hemsby in Norfolk, England. It is the smallest windfarm owned by E.ON; taking up 3 hectares. It has a nameplate capacity of 2.25MW which is enough to power 1000 homes at peak. There were 10 Vestas V27-225 kW turbines which were 30 metres tall and stand on top of Blood Hill. They are visible from the villages of Hemsby and Winterton-on-Sea. Blood Hill began operating in December 1992 and was one of the first windfarms in the United Kingdom.

In 2000 a much larger 65m 1.5MW Ecotricity turbine was built adjacent to the site.

In 2015 a repowering of the site saw the original 10 turbines replaced with 2 two Turbowind T400 wind turbines.

See also

Wind power in the United Kingdom
Sheringham Shoal Offshore Wind Farm
Scroby Sands wind farm

References

Wind farms in England
Buildings and structures in Norfolk
E.ON
Power stations in the East of England